Naam Gum Jayegaa is a 2003 show that telecasted on Sony TV with a total of 60 episodes, and starred Gauri Pradhan, Shilpa Kadam and Kanwaljit Singh.

Cast
 Gauri Pradhan as Priyanka Singh
 Shilpa Kadam
 Kanwaljit Singh
 Hiten Tejwani
 Sachin Shroff
 Hasan Zaidi

References

External links
 

Hindi-language television shows
2003 Indian television series debuts
2003 Indian television series endings